Glass Bridge may refer to:
 Zhangjiajie Glass Bridge, Hunan, China
 East Taihang Glasswalk, Hebei Province, China
 Kyiv Glass Bridge, a pedestrian bridge in Khreshchatyi Park, Kyiv, Ukraine
 "The Glass Bridge", a song by Animals as Leaders from the album The Madness of Many, 2016